Submarine D-1 is a 1937 drama directed by Lloyd Bacon and starring Pat O'Brien, George Brent and Wayne Morris. The film was produced by Cosmopolitan Productions and released by Warner Bros.

Plot
Butch Rogers and Sock McGillis are old submarine hands stationed in Panama. On land, Butch and Sock battle over pretty Ann Sawyer. At sea and underwater, however, our two heroes are virtually inseparable.

Cast
 Pat O'Brien as 'Butch' Rogers
 George Brent as Lt. Commander Dan Matthews
 Wayne Morris as 'Sock' McGillis
 Frank McHugh as 'Lucky' Jones
 Doris Weston as Ann Sawyer
 Henry O'Neill as Admiral Thomas
 Dennie Moore as Arabella
 Veda Ann Borg as Dolly
 Regis Toomey as Tom Callan

References

External links 
 
 
 

1937 drama films
1937 films
American drama films
American black-and-white films
Films directed by Lloyd Bacon
Warner Bros. films
Submarine films
1930s American films